Minor Hill is a city in Giles County, Tennessee, United States. The population was 537 at the 2010 census.

History
Minor Hill is named for Joseph Minor, an early settler in the area. A later owner of the Minor tract donated part of it for the establishment of a school, church, and cemetery in the mid-19th century.  A post office was established in 1870, and the city incorporated that same year.

On November 19, 1863, during the Civil War, Confederate scout Sam Davis was captured at Minor Hill.  He was taken to Pulaski, where he was executed eight days later.  A monument to Davis now stands in Minor Hill at the site where he was captured.

Noted gospel song book publisher James David Vaughan published his first song book in Minor Hill in 1900.  Vaughan and three of his brothers performed as a gospel quartet throughout the region.

Geography
Minor Hill is located at  (35.038466, -87.171135). State Route 11 passes through the city, connecting it to Pulaski to the northeast and Lauderdale County, Alabama, to the southwest (the road becomes Alabama State Route 207 at the state line).

Demographics

As of the census of 2000, there were 437 people, 181 households, and 129 families residing in the city. The population density was 275.2 people per square mile (106.1/km2). There were 200 housing units at an average density of 126.0 per square mile (48.6/km2). The racial makeup of the city was 98.63% White, 0.46% African American, 0.23% from other races, and 0.69% from two or more races. Hispanic or Latino of any race were 0.69% of the population.

There were 181 households, out of which 32.0% had children under the age of 18 living with them, 56.9% were married couples living together, 11.6% had a female householder with no husband present, and 28.7% were non-families. 28.7% of all households were made up of individuals, and 14.4% had someone living alone who was 65 years of age or older. The average household size was 2.41 and the average family size was 2.95.

In the city, the population was spread out, with 27.5% under the age of 18, 6.9% from 18 to 24, 28.6% from 25 to 44, 18.8% from 45 to 64, and 18.3% who were 65 years of age or older. The median age was 36 years. For every 100 females, there were 86.8 males. For every 100 females age 18 and over, there were 92.1 males.

The median income for a household in the city was $27,625, and the median income for a family was $30,714. Males had a median income of $26,645 versus $23,250 for females. The per capita income for the city was $13,373. About 14.5% of families and 13.6% of the population were below the poverty line, including 14.8% of those under age 18 and 6.9% of those age 65 or over.

Points of interest
 Huntsville TV Tower

References

External links

 
Municipal Technical Advisory Service entry for Minor Hill — information on local government, elections, and link to charter

Cities in Tennessee
Cities in Giles County, Tennessee
1870 establishments in Tennessee